Gregory L. Frazer is an American politician serving as a member of the Montana House of Representatives from the 78th district. Elected in November 2020, he assumed office on January 4, 2021.

Background 
After graduating from high school, Frazer joined the United States Army Reserve, serving from 2000 to 2008. He has since worked as a corrections officer for the Montana State Prison. Frazer was elected to the Montana House of Representatives in November 2020 and assumed office on January 4, 2021, succeeding Gordon Pierson.

References 

Living people
Republican Party members of the Montana House of Representatives
1983 births